Una Cara Al Cielo is an album by Lucha Reyes released on the FTA label (FLPS-126) in 1971. Reyes was accompanied on the album by Cesar Silva (accordion and organ), Polo Bances (alto saxophone and clarinet), Guillermo Vergara (bass), Gerardo "Pomadita" Lazón (cajón), Alvaro Perez (guitar), and Máximo Artega (guitar).

Track listing
Side A
 "Amor Y Mas Amor" (Felix Figueroa)
 "De Puerta En Puerta" (Augusto Polo Campos)
 "Corazón" (Lorenzo Humberto Sotomayor)
 "Sonrisas" (Pedro Espinal)
 "Presagio" (Julio De Lima)
 "Moreno Pintan A Cristo" (Rosa Mercedes Ayarza de Morales)

Side B 
 "Déjalos" (Félix Pasache)
 "Mira Bien Si Hay Razón" (Angel Aníbal Rosado)
 "Amelia" (Felipe Pinglo Alva)
 "Mentira" (Augusto Polo Campos)
 "Mis Celos" (Angel Aníbal Rosado)
 "Mas Allá" (Adrián Flores Albán)

References

1972 albums
Spanish-language albums